Dichomeris permundella is a moth in the family Gelechiidae. It was described by Francis Walker in 1864. It is found in Peru and Amazonas, Brazil.

Adults are slaty cinereous, the forewings with three cupreous-brown marks, the first and second bordered by cinereous. The first also forming an elongated spot, which rests on the interior border before the middle. The third forms a dot in the exterior disc, bordered with cinereous on the inner side. The exterior border is pale fawn colour with black points.

References

Moths described in 1864
permundella